Toxodera maculata is a species of praying mantis found in southern China, Laos, Thailand, West Malaysia, Sumatra, Java, and Borneo. Females have a body length up to 130mm.

See also

List of mantis genera and species

References

Mantidae
Mantodea of Asia
Insects described in 2009